"Noise" is a song co-written and recorded by American country music artist Kenny Chesney. It was released in March 2016 as the first single from his 2016 album Cosmic Hallelujah. Chesney wrote this song with Ross Copperman, Shane McAnally, and Jon Nite.

Music video
The music video was directed by Shaun Silva and premiered in May 2016.

Commercial performance
"Noise" entered the U.S. Billboard Country Airplay chart at number 21 during its first week of release, making this Chesney's record-extending ninth top 25 debut. The song debuted on the Hot Country Songs chart at number 33. The following week, when it was released for sale, the song debuted at number 2 on the Country Digital Songs chart, selling 33,000 copies. Afterward, it then rose to number 14 on Hot Country Songs. As of August 2016, the song has sold 214,000 copies in the United States.

Charts

Weekly charts

Year end charts

Certifications

References

2016 songs
2016 singles
Kenny Chesney songs
Columbia Nashville Records singles
Songs written by Kenny Chesney
Songs written by Ross Copperman
Songs written by Shane McAnally
Songs written by Jon Nite
Song recordings produced by Buddy Cannon
Columbia Records singles
Music videos directed by Shaun Silva